Perotis is the name of two genera of organisms:

Perotis (beetle), in the family Buprestidae
Perotis (plant), in the family Poaceae